Caleb de Casper is an American singer and performing artist. They are known for their image and a queer icon and musical versatility, ranging from horror cabaret and glam rock to dark synth pop. Born in a rural community in North Carolina, Caleb de Casper faced significant prejudice from conservative society for their queer identity and expression; Casper often felt that the surrounding community was not accepting of individuals who possessed effeminate or gay characteristics, as they did.

Life and career

1986-2015: Early life and transition to music 
A classically trained pianist and vocalist, Casper attended musical school in North Carolina for several years before moving to Brooklyn, seeking out a more metropolitan lifestyle. They then returned to North Carolina to finish their schooling in a period marked with limited development and many struggles. In their time in Charlotte, North Carolina, Casper often faced difficulty finding work: their ‘horror cabaret’ performances that often ended with spitting blood and bleeding out of their eyes shocked and scared away audiences. However, their career began to progress when they connected with a booking agent named Sean Padilla who successfully booked them their first show in Austin: a performer with local blitzkrieg punk rockers Xetas: the group first began performing in a double-wide trailer that had been converted into a club. In their time in Austin, Casper launched their career as a niche queer artist and performer.

2016-2019: “Femme Boy” 
Casper's varied debut LP, “Femme Boy,” was released in May 2019: it features a variety of musical styles and genres, from dance floor beats, the theatrical stage, and the glitz and ruin of old Hollywood. “Femme Boy” consists of 12 songs focusing on themes of desire, allure, and queer sexuality in a ribald and sensualized manner. The diversity of expression and unique presentation in this collection cements Casper's perception in the public consciousness as a populous alternative diva, a New-Age artist. Collaborating with artists such as p1nkstar and Y2K, Casper also delves into the ethos of queer identity and belonging to marginalized groups: their songs have the same message in the end—“outcasts will find themselves and their people.”

Impact and legacy 
Casper's performances are renowned for their breathtaking, over-the-top theatricality and versatility. They are additionally known for dynamic and gender nonconforming style and appearance, breaking traditional binary gender norms and dressing in genderqueer and fluid costumes, such as fishnets, dresses, and high heels in order to express the diversity of masculinity and express queer visibility. Currently, Casper continues to perform at sold-out shows and continues to express themself by wearing clothing that adheres to their genderqueer identity. In recognition for their contributions to the Austin queer community, the City of Austin proclaimed April 21 to be Caleb De Casper Day, with the honors being presented by Mayor Steve Adler, a month before the release of their debut album.

Notes

References

American singers
Living people
Year of birth missing (living people)